Ptocheuusa is a genus of moths in the family Gelechiidae.

Species
Ptocheuusa abnormella (Herrich-Schäffer, 1854)
Ptocheuusa albiramis (Meyrick, 1923)
Ptocheuusa asterisci (Walsingham, 1903)
Ptocheuusa cuprimarginella Chrétien, 1915
Ptocheuusa dresnayella Lucas, 1945
Ptocheuusa guimarensis (Walsingham, 1908)
Ptocheuusa inopella (Zeller, 1839)
Ptocheuusa minimella (Rebel, 1936)
Ptocheuusa multistrigella Ragonot, 1892
Ptocheuusa paupella (Zeller, 1847)
Ptocheuusa scholastica (Walsingham, 1903)
Ptocheuusa sublutella Christoph, 1873

References

 
Isophrictini